The University Entrance Exam for International or overseas students (YÖS) is for international students to consider applying and studying in Turkish universities and its result is used to evaluate the performance of students and enroll in undergraduate programmes. This exam had been done by the ÖSYM (Measuring, Selection and Placement Center) until 2010. Then, each university in Turkey has the authority to set and design the YÖS examination according to their ruling with the decision of the Higher Education Center.

Online applications for the Ondokuz Mayıs University entrance exam for international or overseas students (OMU-YÖS)  started on 4 January 2016. The exam was held on April 30, at 10.00 am according to the local time of Turkey in five different languages (Turkish, English, Russian, Arabic and German) and given at the same time in 42 different exam centers in 28 countries.

In addition, the Distance Education and Research Center of Ondokuz Mayıs University announced on 19 January 2016 that it would provide a YÖS Preparation Course.

References

External links 
 Yabancı Uyruklu Öğrenci Sınavı - ÖSYM
 YÖS Kursu
 Yabancı Uyruklu Öğrenci Sınavı
 YÖK - YÖS 
 YÖS Nedir? 

Education in Turkey
International education industry